Delphine Bertholon (Lyon, 1976) is a French writer and screenwriter.  She lives currently in Paris and works as a screenwriter.

Publications 
Les Dentelles Mortes,  1998
 Cabine commune,2007
 Twist, 2008
 L’Effet Larsen, 2010
 Ma vie en noir et blanc, 2011
 Grâce, 2012
 Le Soleil à mes pieds, 2013
 Les Corps inutiles, 2015
 Cœur-Naufrage, 2017
Celle qui marche la nuit, 2017/18

References

1976 births
Living people
French women screenwriters
French women novelists
Writers from Lyon